Low Houses, or Seth Low Projects, is a public housing complex built and operated by the New York City Housing Authority (NYCHA) and located in Brownsville, Brooklyn. The development is named after Seth Low (1850–1916). As NYC Mayor, he attacked the existence of unsanitary tenements. Low Houses has four buildings between 17 and 18 stories tall, each with 535 apartments. Completed December 31, 1967, 5.89-acres.
The Low Houses is considered one of Brooklyn's toughest projects and have been known for shootings and gang violence throughout the years.

In Process To Be Converted Into Section 8 RAD PACT Program
In 2016, there were announcements of converting some of the NYCHA developments into Section 8 RAD PACT Management where private companies will manage the developments in a Public-private partnership with NYCHA in order to bring in the capital funding to make necessary repairs and upgrades to the developments. Seth Low Houses was included in this plan as well and is currently under progress to be converted into this program.

References

Multi-building developments in New York City
Public housing in Brooklyn
1967 establishments in New York City
Residential buildings completed in 1967